Hotel Giraffe is a luxury hotel in Rose Hill, Manhattan, New York City. It has won many awards, such as Best Boutique Hotel–2007, according to CitySearch.com. Hotel Giraffe is located at the northeast corner of Park Avenue South and 26th Street.

The establishment is part of the Library Hotel Collection, a boutique hotel group owned by Henry Kallan. There are four hotels within the LHC: the Hotel Giraffe, the Casablanca Hotel Times Square, the Library Hotel, and the Hotel Elysee.
These four consistently rank in the top ten hotels in NYC, according to TripAdvisor.com

Hotel Giraffe opened in December 1999 and was upgraded several times in its first decade.

Design 

Architect Stephen Jacobs and his wife, interior designer Andi Pepper were in charge of the design of the building when Henry Kallan opened Hotel Giraffe in 2000.

Guestrooms at Hotel Giraffe are inspired by the rich lavish colors and textures of the Art Moderne Period. Hotel Giraffe offers 73 guestrooms, including 21 suites.

News and media 
Hotel Giraffe was shown in Sex and the City: The Movie. The Piano Suite was transformed into Mr. Big's apartment. The penthouse at Hotel Giraffe stood in for "Big's" apartment in the film; other scenes were shot in the hotel as well. The Hotel offered a "Divas weekend."

References
 Hotel Giraffe  Official Hotel Giraffe Website. [2008-06-16]
 Hotel Giraffe in Sex and the City Movie MSNBC.com[2008-05-27]
 Owner Henry Kallan names new Hotel after Favorite Animal New York Times [1999-11-07]
 Review of Hotel Giraffe New York Magazine [2008]

Hotels established in 1999
Hotels in Manhattan
Park Avenue
1999 establishments in New York City